Anne Nymark Andersen (born 28 September 1972), also known as Anne Nymark Rylandsholm, is a former Norwegian footballer, world champion and Olympic medalist. Her twin sister Nina Nymark Andersen is also a football player.

During her career, Nymark Andersen played 65 matches and scored 9 goals for the Norway women's national football team. With the Norwegian team, she became European champion in 1993, and world champion in 1995. She won a bronze medal at the 1996 Summer Olympics in Atlanta.

Her clubs include IL Sandviken and Bjørnar.

References

External links 
 
 
 

1972 births
Living people
Norwegian women's footballers
Footballers at the 1996 Summer Olympics
Olympic footballers of Norway
Olympic bronze medalists for Norway
Norwegian twins
Olympic medalists in football
Twin sportspeople
Toppserien players
SK Brann Kvinner players
Arna-Bjørnar players
1995 FIFA Women's World Cup players
FIFA Women's World Cup-winning players
Medalists at the 1996 Summer Olympics
UEFA Women's Championship-winning players
Women's association footballers not categorized by position
1999 FIFA Women's World Cup players

Norway women's international footballers